The U.S. Army enlisted rank insignia that was used during World War II differs from the current system. The color scheme used for the insignia's chevron design was defined as golden olive drab chevrons on a dark blue-black wool background for wear on "winter" uniform dress coats and dress shirts or silvery-khaki chevrons on a dark blue-black cotton background for wear on the various types of field jackets and "winter" uniform fatigue shirts. An unauthorized variant that nevertheless saw wide use was olive drab chevrons on a khaki cotton background for wear on the "summer" uniform dress coats (introduced in 1929 and discontinued for issue in 1938) and dress shirts. This scheme of rank insignia was established by War Department Circular No. 303 on 5 August 1920 and would see two significant changes in 1942. The usage of this style of insignia was ended by Department of the Army Circular No. 202, dated 7 July 1948, which provided for significant changes in both rank and insignia design.

Pay grades
In 1920, the United States Army pay grade system was modified so the enlisted ranks were completely separated from the officer ranks. Previously, the grades of pay were numbered from 1 (general or admiral) to about 21 (private or apprentice seaman). Military budgets had previously paid servicemen by their military occupation rather than their rank, leading to 134 different trades with an array of insignia and no clear authority. Trades were now grouped in seven "grades" of pay separated by rank. The "7th grade" indicated the lowest enlisted grade (i.e., private) and the "1st grade" signified the highest (i.e., master sergeant). Officers were paid in pay periods of 1st (second lieutenants and ensigns) through 8th (generals and admirals). Warrant officers' pay was still set by act of Congress, but their privileges, benefits, and pensions were equal to those of second lieutenants.

The "E" (enlisted scale), "W" (warrant officer scale), and "O" (officer scale) grade prefixes were not used until introduced by the Career Compensation Act of 1949. In 1951, the enlisted pay grades were reversed, with the "1st grade" being the lowest enlisted grade and the "7th grade" being the highest. The army rank of sergeant major was not restored until 1958, with the addition of the "super grades" of E-8 (first sergeant and master sergeant) and E-9 (sergeant major).

1920–1942

Specialist

The rating (not rank) of specialist had the command responsibilities of either a private first class or private, but conveyed slightly higher pay depending on the specialty and skill. This additional pay, in addition to the number of specialists of the sixth and seventh grades in relation to the total number of enlisted men of these grades, was defined in the National Defense Act of 1920.

While the official insignia was a single chevron, it was not uncommon for local commanders to authorize local use of specialist insignia which consisted of one chevron and one to six rockers depending on the pay grade of the specialist (one rocker in the 6th grade, six rockers in the 1st grade). To indicate their specialty, a trade badge was sometimes inset between the chevron and the first rocker. These were often identical to the abandoned trade badges used before the reforms of 1920.

Technical sergeant
The rank of technical sergeant was renamed sergeant first class in 1948. However, it still survives as an Air Force rank.

1943–1948

Technicians
On 8 January 1942, under War Department Circular No. 5, the ranks of technician third grade (T/3), technician fourth grade (T/4), and technician fifth grade (T/5) were created. The existing specialist ranks were abolished effective 1 June 1942 by War Department Circular No. 204, and all personnel ranked as such were disrated and reappointed as follows:

The ranks of specialist fifth class and specialist sixth class were also discontinued, and the men who ranked as such were paid according to their rank as privates first class or privates, respectively. Initially, the technician ranks used the same insignia as staff sergeant, sergeant, and corporal, respectively, but on 4 September 1942, Change 1 to Army Regulation 600-35 added a "T" for "technician" underneath the standard chevron design that corresponded with that grade. A technician was generally not addressed as such, but rather as the equivalent noncommissioned rank in its pay grade (T/5 as corporal; T/4 as sergeant; T/3 as sergeant or staff sergeant). Initially, technicians held the same authority as noncommissioned officers of their grade, but the Army declared in late 1943 amid a surplus of ranking noncommissioned officers in certain units originating from this policy that only technicians who were appointed prior to 1 December 1943 would continue to keep the authority of their respective grades; men appointed after would still draw the pay of their equivalent noncommissioned officer rank, but would only have the authority of privates.

The technician ranks were removed from the rank system in 1948. The concept was brought back with specialist ranks in 1955.

First sergeant
On September 22, 1942, in Change 3 to Army Regulation 600–35, the rank of first sergeant was increased from the 2nd grade to the 1st grade in pay. The insignia was changed to add a third rocker to match the other 1st grade rank, master sergeant.

Abbreviations
As seen in the comparative chart below, the U.S. Army ranks during World War II were not abbreviated the same as they currently are today having all letters capitalized. Rather, only the first letter was capitalized, followed by the rest of the abbreviated word in the lower case, and a period to indicate it as being an abbreviation. In some cases, two or more letters were capitalized with a slash mark after the first letter to indicate that there was more than one word in the full title of the rank. See the comparative chart below.

Comparative chart
Some ranks are not included in the chart for a proper comparison.

See also
 Comparative officer ranks of World War II
 List of ranks used by the United States Army
 United States Army enlisted rank insignia
 United States Army enlisted rank insignia of World War I
 United States Army officer rank insignia
 United States Army uniforms in World War II

Citations

General sources 
 Lieutenant Colonel Robert Alexander McDonald biography
 Rank, Enlisted, U.S. Army entry from the Saving Private Ryan online encyclopedia

United States Army rank insignia
World War II military equipment of the United States